The 1993 East Texas State Lions football team represented East Texas State University—now known as Texas A&M University–Commerce—as a member of the Lone Star Conference (LSC) during the 1993 NCAA Division II football season. Led by eighth-year head coach Eddie Vowell, the Lions compiled an overall record of 5–6 with a mark of 1–4 in conference play, tying for fifth place in the LSC. The team played its home games at Memorial Stadium in Commerce, Texas.

Schedule

Postseason awards

All-Americans
Fred Woods, Linebacker, First Team (Consensus)
Billy Watkins, Placekicker, First Team
Duane Hicks, Defensive Tackle, Third Team
Kevin Mathis, Cornerback, Honorable Mention
Cubby Gillingwater, Punter, Honorable Mention

All-Lone Star Conference

LSC First Team
Eric Herrick, Offensive Guard
Duane Hicks, Defensive Tackle
Fred Woods, Linebacker

LSC Second Team
Clint Dolezel, Quarterback
Cubby Gillingwater, Punter 
Brian Jones, Offensive Tackle
Kevin Mathis, Cornerback
Billy Watkins, Kicker
Donald Wesley, Wide Receiver

LSC Honorable Mention
Marcus Gates, Defensive Back
Michael Hightower, Running Back
Clarence Nobles, Linebacker

References

East Texas State
Texas A&M–Commerce Lions football seasons
East Texas State Lions football